Norm Sharp (23 June 1934 – 8 October 2014) was an Australian rules footballer who played with Geelong in the Victorian Football League during the 1950s. 

A ruckman, Sharp was a premiership player in his debut season in 1952 and won a best and fairest two years later. A knee injury caused him to retire prematurely at the age of just 23.

References

External links

1934 births
Australian rules footballers from Victoria (Australia)
Geelong Football Club players
Geelong Football Club Premiership players
Carji Greeves Medal winners
Camperdown Football Club players
2014 deaths
One-time VFL/AFL Premiership players